Yuzuki is a feminine Japanese given name, primarily used by women, and is also used as a surname. It may refer to:

People

Surname 
, Japanese writer 
, Japanese actress 
, Japanese actress
, Japanese actress and singer

Given name 
 , Japanese model and professional wrestler
 , Japanese actress
 , Japanese footballer
 , Japanese novelist
 , Japanese professional footballer
 , Japanese professional footballer

Fictional characters 
 , a Vocaloid character
 , a character in the manga and anime series Monthly Girls' Nozaki-kun
 , a character from the Assassination Classroom   manga and anime series
 , a character from the "Hololive" virtual YouTuber (VTuber) talent agency

Other 
 Japanese destroyer Yūzuki
 Yuzuki Castle

Japanese-language surnames
Japanese feminine given names